Jon Rudnitsky (born November 22, 1989) is an American actor and comedian. First breaking through as a performer with the Los Angeles comedy troupe The Groundlings, Rudnitsky garnered widespread attention for his brief stint as a cast member on the NBC sketch comedy series Saturday Night Live during the show's 41st season between 2015 and 2016. Since his departure from SNL, he has also played McWatt in the 2019 miniseries Catch-22.

Early life
Rudnitsky is a native of Harrington Park, New Jersey. His mother, Karen, is in charge of the gerontology center at The Valley Hospital in Ridgewood, New Jersey, and his father, Steven, is a businessman in the hospitality industry.

Rudnitsky attended Northern Valley Regional High School at Old Tappan.  He subsequently studied acting at the University of Southern California. His maternal uncle is Michael Oren, the former Israeli Ambassador to the United States. Rudnitsky is Jewish.

Career
Rudnitsky performed with the Groundlings. On August 31, 2015, it was announced that Rudnitsky would join the cast of Saturday Night Live as a featured player for the show's forty-first season. In the third episode of that season, Rudnitsky portrayed Anderson Cooper in a sketch, acting as moderator for a Democratic presidential debate, for which he received criticism from Cooper. He has also done impressions of Wolf Blitzer, John Mayer, Martin Scorsese, Tom Cruise, and Vladimir Putin (in a dress rehearsal sketch on the season 41 episode hosted by Donald Trump), while also doing a Dirty Dancing sketch for Weekend Update, which was seen as one of his high points for the season. On August 9, 2016, it was reported that Rudnitsky would not be returning to the show for the following season.

In 2017, Rudnitsky starred alongside Reese Witherspoon in the romantic comedy film Home Again. In 2018, Jon played Mike in the Netflix release Set It Up.

He starred alongside Jane Lynch and Genevieve Angelson in the NBC pilot Relatively Happy, which was not picked up.

In March 2020, Rudnitsky was cast as Mike Devries in the musical comedy-drama television series The Big Leap, which premiered on Fox on September 20, 2021.

Filmography

References

External links

1989 births
Living people
American sketch comedians
American stand-up comedians
Male actors from New Jersey
Northern Valley Regional High School at Old Tappan alumni
People from Harrington Park, New Jersey
USC School of Dramatic Arts alumni
21st-century American male actors
American impressionists (entertainers)
Jewish American male actors
Jewish American comedians
21st-century American comedians
American male comedians
Comedians from New Jersey
Jewish American male comedians
21st-century American Jews